Gloucester City Council is the local authority for Gloucester, which is split into 18 wards, with a total of 39 councillors elected to serve on the City Council.

History

The district was formed from the County Borough of Gloucester on 1 April 1974 under the Local Government Act 1972. The parish of Quedgeley was subsequently added in 1991.

Responsibilities

Gloucester City Council carries out a variety of district council functions including:
Benefits - Housing and Council Tax
Car Parking
Concessionary Travel
Council Tax - Administration and Collection
Elections and Electoral Registration
Environmental Health (includes Domestic and Commercial Premises)
Food Safety and Hygiene Complaints
Noise Pollution and Pest Control
Housing Administration
Licensing
Caravan Sites
Planning, including Planning Applications, Advice and Appeals
Public Conveniences
Health and Leisure Centres
Refuse Collection
Recycling
Tourism and Visitor Information

Premises
The Guildhall at 23 Eastgate Street was built in 1892 for the old Gloucester City Council (also known as Gloucester Corporation), the body which governed the County Borough of Gloucester from 1889 to 1974. Following the local government reorganisation of 1974, the new Gloucester City Council continued to use the Guildhall as its headquarters until 1986.

In 1985 the council purchased North Warehouse at Gloucester Docks, which had been built in 1826. North Warehouse was reconfigured internally to provide a civic suite and council chamber, as well as office space for the council. The council vacated Guildhall and moved to North Warehouse in 1986. Around the same time, the council also leased from the Canal & River Trust three nearby warehouses called Herbert Warehouse, Kimberley Warehouse and Philpotts Warehouse, which had all been built in 1846. The former Kimberley and Philpotts warehouses were incorporated into Herbert Warehouse via glazed linking sections being added between them, with a public house and retail uses on the ground floor and additional council offices on the upper floors. The Herbert Warehouse building was completed in 1988.

In 2019 the council vacated Herbert Warehouse, instead leasing office space for its staff within Shire Hall and also acquiring a former shop at 92–96 Westgate Street to be the council's main public reception, called "The Gateway". The council's meeting place remains the council chamber and civic suite in North Warehouse.

References

Local authorities in Gloucestershire
Politics of Gloucester
Non-metropolitan district councils of England